Christmas Eve is the evening or day before Christmas Day.

Christmas Eve may also refer to:

Film and theatre
 Christmas Eve (1947 film), an American comedy directed by Edwin L. Marin 
 Christmas Eve, a 1986 American film directed by Stuart Cooper
 Christmas Eve (2015 film), an American comedy directed by Mitch Davis
 Christmas Eve, a character in the Broadway musical Avenue Q
 "Christmas Eve", the fortieth episode of the NBC television series Superstore

Literature
 "Christmas Eve" (Gogol), an 1832 short story by Nikolai Gogol
 "A Christmas Eve", a short story by Camillo Boito
 "Christmas-Eve and Easter-Day", a poem by Robert Browning

Music
 Christmas Eve (opera), an 1895 opera by Nikolai Rimsky-Korsakov
 "Christmas Eve/Sarajevo 12/24", a 1995 medley performed by Savatage and the Trans-Siberian Orchestra
 Christmas Eve and Other Stories, a 1996 album by the Trans-Siberian Orchestra
 "Christmas Eve" (Gwen Stefani song), 2017
 "Christmas Eve" (Kelly Clarkson song), 2017
 "Christmas Eve", a song by Blackmore's Night from Winter Carols, 2006
 "Christmas Eve", a song by Celine Dion from These Are Special Times, 1998
 "Christmas Eve", a song by Justin Bieber from Under the Mistletoe, 2011
 "Christmas Eve", a song by Ringo Starr from I Wanna Be Santa Claus, 1999
 "Christmas Eve", a song by Tatsuro Yamashita from Melodies, 1983

See also
 The Night Before Christmas (disambiguation)
 Twas the Night Before Christmas (disambiguation)